Balurghat Assembly constituency is an assembly constituency in Dakshin Dinajpur district in the Indian state of West Bengal.

Overview
As per orders of the Delimitation Commission, No. 39 Balurghat Assembly constituency covers Balurghat municipality, Amritakhand, Vatpara and Chingishpur gram panchayats of Balurghat community development block and Hilli community development block.

Balurghat Assembly constituency is part of No. 6 Balurghat (Lok Sabha constituency).

Members of Legislative Assembly

Election results

2021
In the 2021 election, Ashok Kumar Lahiri of BJP defeated his nearest rival Sekhar Dasgupta of Trinamool Congress.

2016
In the 2016 election, Biswanath Chowdhury of RSP defeated his nearest rival Shankar Chakraborty of Trinamool Congress.

2011
In the 2011 election, Shankar Chakraborty of Trinamool Congress defeated his nearest rival Bishwanath Chowdhury of RSP.

.# Trinamool Congress did not contest the seat in 2006.

1977–2006
Biswanath Chowdhury of RSP has made it seven in a row winning the Balurghat assembly seat in all years from 1977 to 2006. Contests in most years were multi cornered but only winners and runners are being mentioned. He defeated Deboshree Choudhury of BJP in 2006, Sankar Chakraborty of Trinamool Congress in 2001, Biplab Khan of Congress in 1996 and 1991, Madhab Chandra Roy of Congress in 1987, Asish Roy of ICS in 1982 and Jyotiswar Sarkar of Congress in 1977.

1951–1972
Bireswar Roy of Congress won in 1972 and 1971. Mukul Basu of RSP/Independent won in 1969 and 1967. Sushil Ranjan Chattopadhya of Congress won in 1962. In 1957 and 1951, Balurghat was joint seat. In 1957 Mardi Hakai of Congress and Dhirendra Nath Banerjee, Independent, won. In independent India's first election, Saroj Ranjan Chattopadhyay and Lakshman Chandra Handa, both of Congress, won.

References

Assembly constituencies of West Bengal
Politics of Dakshin Dinajpur district